Coleman County Electric Cooperative, Inc. is a non-profit rural electric utility cooperative headquartered in Coleman, Texas.

The Cooperative was organized in 1937.

The Cooperative serves portions of three counties in the state of Texas, in a territory generally surrounding Coleman.

Currently the Cooperative has 3,780 miles of line and serves approximately 8,600 meters.

External links
Coleman County Electric Cooperative

Companies based in Texas
Electric cooperatives in Texas
Coleman County, Texas
Concho County, Texas
Runnels County, Texas